William David Bragg (born 24 October 1986) is a former Welsh cricketer. Born in Newport, he first came to prominence scoring an unbeaten 115 in Glamorgan's pre season tour of South Africa in 2007.  He is a top order batsman for Glamorgan often batting at number 3, although Mark Cosgrove dislodged him from this spot for a little time. Despite his 45 first class matches, he has only managed two centuries against Leicestershire in 2011 and 2015. He is also a wicket-keeper. He was educated at Rougemont School.He announced his retirement on 5 December 2017

References

External links
 

1986 births
Living people
Welsh cricketers
Wales National County cricketers
Glamorgan cricketers
Wicket-keepers